Codonoboea is a genus of flowering plants in the family Gesneriaceae. Many of its species were formerly placed in the genus Henckelia.

Species
Species include:
Codonoboea alba (Ridl.) C.L.Lim
Codonoboea albina (Ridl.) Kiew
Codonoboea albomarginata (Hemsl.) Kiew
Codonoboea alternans (Ridl.) Kiew
Codonoboea anthonyi (Kiew) C.L.Lim
Codonoboea ascendens (Ridl.) C.L.Lim
Codonoboea atrosanguinea (Ridl.) C.L.Lim
Codonoboea bombycina (Ridl.) C.L.Lim
Codonoboea breviflora (Ridl.) Kiew
Codonoboea caelestis Ridl.
Codonoboea calcarea (Ridl.) Kiew
Codonoboea castaneifolia (Ridl.) Kiew
Codonoboea codonion (Kiew) C.L.Lim
Codonoboea corneri (Kiew) Kiew
Codonoboea craspedodroma (Kiew) Kiew
Codonoboea crinita (Jack) C.L.Lim
Codonoboea crocea (Ridl.) C.L.Lim
Codonoboea curtisii (Ridl.) C.L.Lim
Codonoboea davisonii (Kiew) Kiew
Codonoboea dawnii (Kiew) Kiew
Codonoboea densifolia (Ridl.) C.L.Lim
Codonoboea doryphylla (B.L.Burtt) C.L.Lim
Codonoboea elata (Ridl.) Rafidah
Codonoboea ericiflora (Ridl.) Ridl.
Codonoboea falcata (Kiew) Kiew
Codonoboea fasciata (Ridl.) C.L.Lim
Codonoboea flava (Ridl.) Kiew
Codonoboea flavescens (Ridl.) Kiew
Codonoboea flavobrunnea (Ridl.) Kiew
Codonoboea floribunda (M.R.Hend.) C.L.Lim
Codonoboea geitleri (A.Weber) C.L.Lim
Codonoboea glabrata (Ridl.) Kiew
Codonoboea grandifolia (Ridl.) Kiew
Codonoboea heterophylla (Ridl.) C.L.Lim
Codonoboea hirsuta (Ridl.) C.L.Lim
Codonoboea hirta (Ridl.) Kiew
Codonoboea hispida (Ridl.) Kiew
Codonoboea holttumii (M.R.Hend.) C.L.Lim
Codonoboea humilis (Miq.) D.J.Middleton & Mich.Möller
Codonoboea inaequalis (Ridl.) Kiew
Codonoboea johorica (Ridl.) Kiew
Codonoboea kelantanensis (Kiew) Kiew
Codonoboea lancifolia (M.R.Hend.) C.L.Lim
Codonoboea leiophylla (Kiew) C.L.Lim
Codonoboea leucantha (Kiew) Kiew
Codonoboea leucocodon (Ridl.) Ridl.
Codonoboea lilacina (Ridl.) Ridl.
Codonoboea longipes (C.B.Clarke) Kiew
Codonoboea malayana (Hook.f.) Kiew
Codonoboea marginata (C.B.Clarke) C.L.Lim
Codonoboea miniata (Kiew) C.L.Lim
Codonoboea modesta (Ridl.) Kiew
Codonoboea nitida (Kiew & A.Weber) Kiew
Codonoboea nivea Kiew
Codonoboea parviflora (Ridl.) Kiew
Codonoboea pauziana (Kiew) Kiew
Codonoboea pectinata (C.B.Clarke ex Oliv.) Kiew
Codonoboea platypus (C.B.Clarke) C.L.Lim
Codonoboea polyanthoides (Kiew) C.L.Lim
Codonoboea primulina (Ridl.) Kiew
Codonoboea pulchella (Ridl.) C.L.Lim
Codonoboea pumila (Ridl.) C.L.Lim
Codonoboea puncticulata (Ridl.) C.L.Lim
Codonoboea pyroliflora (Ridl.) Kiew
Codonoboea quinquevulnera (Ridl.) C.L.Lim
Codonoboea ramosa (Ridl.) Kiew
Codonoboea reptans (Jack) C.L.Lim
Codonoboea ridleyana (B.L.Burtt) Kiew
Codonoboea robinsonii (Ridl.) Kiew
Codonoboea rubiginosa (Ridl.) C.L.Lim
Codonoboea rugosa (Ridl.) C.L.Lim
Codonoboea salicina (Ridl.) C.L.Lim
Codonoboea salicinoides (Kiew) C.L.Lim
Codonoboea serratifolia (Ridl.) Kiew
Codonoboea soldanella (Ridl.) C.L.Lim
Codonoboea stolonifera (Kiew) Kiew
Codonoboea tiumanica (Burkill ex Ridl.) C.L.Lim
Codonoboea urticoides (A.Weber) Kiew
Codonoboea venusta (Ridl.) Kiew
Codonoboea viscida (Ridl.) Kiew
Codonoboea yongii (Kiew) C.L.Lim

References

Didymocarpoideae
Gesneriaceae genera